Jim "Nipper" Bradford (2 March 1926 – 8 March 2005) was an Australian rules football player. He played seven games with Collingwood in 1943, and nine with North Melbourne in 1949.

He was the shortest player ever to play Australian rules football at the highest level. He stood five feet tall (152 centimetres). 

Bradford played 76 games for Camberwell and kicked 169 goals (1945-48). He won Camberwell's best and fairest in 1945, 1946. 

He was named as the rover in Camberwell Football Club's Team of the Century.

References

External links

Collingwood Football Club players
North Melbourne Football Club players
Camberwell Football Club players
West Torrens Football Club players
Australian rules footballers from Victoria (Australia)
1926 births
2005 deaths